Tobermorey Station is a pastoral lease that operates as a cattle station in the Alice Springs region of the Northern Territory. Tobermorey is on the western edge of Punthamara territory

Location
The property is bounded to the north by Manners Creek Station, to the west by Marqua Station, to the west and south by Atnetye Aboriginal Land Trust and to the east by the Queensland border. Several watercourses flow through the property including Field River, Manners Creek and Marqua Creek. The Plenty Highway passes through the northern end of the station near to the homestead.

Description
The southern portion of Tobermorey is red soil with areas of sandhills, lightly timbered and supporting areas of buffel grass around the watercourses. The northern section is open plain country timbered with Mulga and gidyea and covered with Mitchell grass and other herbage.

Facilities
The Tobermorey Roadhouse provides both unleaded and diesel petroleum, a store stocked with a small variety of small goods, souvenirs, tyre repairs, powered and unpowered campsites and cabin accommodation for motorists heading west along Plenty Highway towards the Stuart Highway, and those heading east into Queensland via the Donohue Highway.

History
Cattle belonging to Robert Anderson have been grazing on the lands since 1910. Anderson, who was previously a shopkeeper at Urandangie, moved to the area in 1913 to establish Tobermorey.

Severe bushfires hit the area in 1952 and by 1954 the property was in the grip of drought, with the Andersons preparing to ship their breeding stock from the property. The Anderson family sold the property in the 1980s.

In 2009 the property was owned by Sterling Buntine, who had placed it up for auction; it was passed in at 11 million. By 2011 Tobermorey had been sold along with Linda Downs for 17.5 million. The current owners of the property are John and Bill Speed and their families.

See also
List of ranches and stations
List of the largest stations in Australia

References

Pastoral leases in the Northern Territory
Stations (Australian agriculture)
1913 establishments in Australia